Ronald B. Herzman and William R. Cook are both Distinguished Teaching Professors at the State University of New York at Geneseo, and are collaborators on numerous intellectual projects about Medieval and Renaissance literature, history, and culture. Herzman is a professor of English, and Cook is a professor of History. Herzman earned his PhD from the University of Delaware and joined the Geneseo faculty in 1969. Cook earned his PhD from Cornell University and joined the Geneseo faculty in 1970; he has specialized in the history and art history of the early Franciscans.

Cook and Herzman have been working closely together since 1973 when they co-taught a course at Geneseo called "The Age of Chaucer." They developed similar courses on "The Age of Dante" and "The Age of Francis of Assisi." Their co-authored Oxford University Press book, The Medieval World View grew out of a text they initially wrote for students they took abroad to Italy. In 2003, Cook and Herzman were awarded the Medieval Academy of America’s first-ever CARA Award for Excellence in Teaching Medieval Studies.

In 1998 Cook ran for U.S. Congress, unsuccessfully. In 2006 he was runner-up for Baylor University's prestigious Robert Foster Cherry Award for Great Teaching.

Collaborative projects

The Medieval World View, 3rd Edition, Oxford University Press, 2011

References
 

Cornell University alumni
State University of New York at Geneseo faculty